Mariano García García (born 25 September 1997) is a Spanish middle-distance runner specialising in the 800 metres. He represented his country at the 2019 World Championships without advancing from the first round. Earlier that year, he finished fourth at the 2019 European Indoor Championships. He won the 800 metres race at the 2022 World Athletics Indoor Championship.

International competitions

Personal bests
Outdoor
800 metres – 1:44.85 (Munich 2022)
1500 metres – 3:43.93 (Montreuil 2019)
3000 metres steeplechase – 8:57.63 (Torrent 2017)

Indoor
800 metres – 1:45.12 (New York 2022)
1500 metres – 3:42.53 (Gallur 2019)

References

1997 births
Living people
Spanish male middle-distance runners
World Athletics Championships athletes for Spain
Sportspeople from the Province of Albacete
World Athletics Indoor Championships winners
European Athletics Championships winners
21st-century Spanish people